Lost in Space is a science fiction/fantasy TV series that ran on CBS from 1965 to 1968.

Lost in Space may also refer to:

Film and television
 Lost in Space (film), a 1998 film based on the 1965 TV series
 Lost in Space (1972 TV series), an animated TV cartoon based on the 1960s TV show
 Lost in Space (2018 TV series), a remake of the 1965 TV series
 "Lost in Space" (American Dad!), an episode of American Dad!

Literature
 Lost in Space (comics), a 1991 comic book series based on the TV series
 Lost in Space (1967 novelization), by Ted White (as "Ron Archer") and Dave Van Arnam, a novelization of the 1960s TV show
 Lost in Space, a 1959 science fiction novel by George O. Smith
 Lost in Space, a 1998 novel by Joan D. Vinge

Music

Albums
 Black Elvis/Lost in Space, a 1999 album by Kool Keith
 Lost in Space (Jonzun Crew album), 1983
 Lost in Space (Aimee Mann album), 2002, or its title track
 Lost in Space Part I, a 2007 EP by Avantasia
 Lost in Space Part II, a 2007 EP by Avantasia
 Lost in Space Part I & II, a 2008 album by Avantasia
 Lost in Space (OuterSpace album), a 2016 album by OuterSpace
 Lost in Space, a 2006 boxed set by Radio Massacre International

Songs
 "Lost in Space" (Lighthouse Family song) (1997)
 "Lost in Space" (Electrasy song) (1998)
 "Lost in Space" (Apollo 440 song) (1999)
 "Lost in Space", a 1980 song by Atomic Rooster Atomic Rooster
 "Lost in Space", a 1980 song by Neil Young from Hawks & Doves
 "Lost in Space", a 1998 song by Apollo 440 from Lost in Space soundtrack and Gettin' High on Your Own Supply
 "Lost in Space", a 1999 song by Fountains of Wayne Utopia Parkway
 "Lost in Space", a 1999 song by the Misfits from Famous Monsters
 "Lost in Space", a 2008 song by Avantasia from The Scarecrow
 "Lost in Space", a 2017 song by Tuna from TunaPark

See also

 Lost in the Stars (disambiguation)